Grand Boulevard or Grand Avenue is a north/south street in Kansas City, Missouri.  Grand runs along the 200 east block in the Kansas City street grid system (2 blocks east of Main Street). In the Downtown and Crown Center areas of Kansas City it is an arterial route, continuing on the north as the Grand Ave. Viaduct passing through Richard L. Berkley Riverfront Park and on the south intersecting with Main Street at about the 2800 South Block.

The street was renamed Grand Boulevard of the Americas from 3rd Street to 22nd Street in honor of the Organization of American States.

In some areas of the city, streets running along the same gridline are known as Warwick Boulevard. Between 60th and 65th, Grand is called Morningside Lane. Then, it joins Rockhill to Gregory. South of 83rd street, Grand is not a through street but appears erratically as the name of various culs-de-sac.

Places
 Richard L. Berkley Riverfront Park is near its starting point.
 KC Streetcar starting point is located at 3rd & Grand. RideKC transit center is across the street.
 River Market is located at 3rd & Grand. 
 Arabia Steamboat Museum is located at 400 Grand. 
 City Market is located at 5th & Grand. 
 UMB Bank headquarters is located at 1010 Grand. A branch is at 1010 Grand and 1800 Grand with ATMs seen every couple blocks or miles.
 It passes from 12th Street to I-670 on Grand by the Power & Light District.
 The College Basketball Experience is located at 1301 Grand and connected to the Sprint Center at 1407 Grand.
 United Methodist Church of the Resurrection Downtown campus is located at 1601 Grand.
 The Kansas City Star historic headquarters building is located at 1729 Grand. 
 Crown Center is located at 2450 Grand near its ending point.
 Hallmark Crown Center and Halls Crown Center are tenants in Crown Center. Hallmark Visitors Center is at 2450 Grand in Crown Center.
 Legoland Discovery Center Kansas City connected to SEA LIFE Kansas City is located at 2475 Grand.
 Shook, Hardy & Bacon headquarters is at 2555 Grand.
 Grand Boulevard is used by majority of the Kansas City Area Transportation Authority | RideKC bus routes.
 Intersects with U.S. Route 71, U.S. Route 40, I-70, I-670, I-35, and US 24.

Notes

Streets in Kansas City, Missouri
Boulevards in the United States